María José Martínez Sánchez was the defending champion, but lost in the first round to Ekaterina Makarova.

Maria Sharapova defeated No. 6 seed Samantha Stosur in the final 6–2, 6–4. It was Sharapova's 23rd career title, and her first tournament win in almost a full calendar year.

Seeds
The top eight seeds receive a bye into the second round.

Qualifying

Draw

Finals

Top half

Section 1

Section 2

Bottom half

Section 3

Section 4

References
Main draw

Italian Open - Singles
Women's Singles